Nahr-e Saleh (also Romanized as Nahr-e Şāleḩ) is a village in Jaffal Rural District, in the Central District of Shadegan County, Khuzestan Province, Iran. At the 2006 census, its population was 295, in 53 families.

References 

Populated places in Shadegan County